In the mythology of Tikopia, the Atua I Kafika (also known as Sako) is a culture hero and supreme god.

References

Sky and weather gods
Tikopian deities
Polynesian gods